Zenit (Zenith) was a series of military photoreconnaissance satellites launched by the Soviet Union between 1961 and 1994. To conceal their nature, all flights were given the public Kosmos designation.

Description 
The basic design of the Zenit satellites was similar to the Vostok manned spacecraft, sharing the return and service modules. This capsule contained the camera system, its film, recovery beacons, parachutes and a destruct charge. In orbit, this was attached to a service module that contained batteries, electronic equipment, an orientation system and a liquid-fuelled rocket engine that would slow the Zenit for re-entry, before the service module detached.

Unlike the American CORONA spacecraft, the return capsule carried both the film and the cameras and kept them in a temperature-controlled pressurised environment. This simplified the design and engineering of the camera system but added considerably to the mass of the satellite. An advantage was that cameras could be reused. The camera would either land on the ground or be  recovered in midair by a modified Mil Mi-8 helicopter. 

Early Zenits were launched using the Vostok rocket; later versions used the Voskhod and the Soyuz rockets. The first flights were launched from Baikonur Cosmodrome but subsequent launches also took place at Plesetsk Cosmodrome.

History
In 1956, the Soviet government issued a secret decree that authorised the development of "Object D" which led to the program to launch Sputnik 3 (Sputnik 1 was a simplified spin-off of the Object D program.) The text of the decree remains secret, but it apparently authorised another satellite program – "Object OD-1" – which was to be used for photo-reconnaissance from space.

By 1958, the OKB-1 design bureau was simultaneously working on Object OD-1 and Object OD-2 – an early design for the Vostok crewed spacecraft. The development of Object OD-1 was experiencing serious difficulties so the head of OKB-1, Sergei Korolev, initiated work to see if a design based on Object OD-2 could be used for an unmanned photo-reconnaissance satellite. This may have been a political manoeuvre that would enable him to continue the manned space program and avoid diverting more of OKB-1's resources into Object OD-1.

Despite bitter opposition from the military the Soviet government endorsed Korolev's approach and issued decrees on 22 and 25 May 1959 which ordered the development of three different spacecraft, all based on the same basic, Object OD-2, design. Spacecraft 1K would be a simplified prototype, 2K was to be a reconnaissance satellite and 3K was to be for manned flights. The name Vostok was also initially used for all three of these craft. But in 1961 the name became publicly known as the name of Yuri Gagarin's spacecraft so the "Vostok 2" reconnaissance satellite was renamed "Zenit 2".

The first Zenit launch attempt took place on 11 December 1961, but there was a fault in the rocket's third stage and the spacecraft was destroyed using its destruct charge. The second attempt — publicly referred to as Kosmos 4 — was successfully launched on 26 April 1962 and re-entered three days later. However a failure in the orientation system meant few useful pictures were obtained; usable pictures had a resolution of about 5 to 7 meters. Launch #3 on 1 June 1962 failed dramatically when one of the 8A92 booster's strap-ons shut down at liftoff and fell onto the pad, exploding on impact. The rest of the launch vehicle crashed 300 meters away. This accident caused considerable damage to Site 1, delaying the flights of Vostok 3 and Vostok 4 by two months.

On 28 July 1962, Site 1 was back in service to host the next Zenit flight, which performed successfully. Testing continued over the next year largely without incident but on 10 July 1963, another launch accident occurred in practically identical fashion to the June 1962 failure. Once again, one of the strap-ons shut down at liftoff, separated from the booster, and exploded on impact with the pad while the rest of the launch vehicle crashed a few hundred feet away.

Examination of telemetry from the booster indicated that some sort of electrical failure occurred, but subsequent investigation took three months and finally concluded that a switch designed to cut power to the strap-ons at staging had malfunctioned, possibly due to liftoff-induced vibration. The electrical circuit in the 8A92 was redesigned and it never again experienced problems with the strap-ons shutting down at launch.

Many versions of the satellite were developed for different reconnaissance missions and flights continued until 1994.

Zenit variants

Zenit 2 
Zenit 2 was the first version to be launched in 1961 (there was no Zenit 1).

The arrangement of cameras varied, but most flights carried four cameras of 1000 mm focal length, and one of 200 mm focal length. The single lower resolution camera was intended to provide low-resolution pictures that would help give a context to the high-resolution pictures.

The ground resolution was stated to be  although some unofficial sources claim it was much better—one source claims the number of cars in a car park could be counted. The cameras were developed at the Krasnogorsk Optical-Mechanical Factory near Moscow. The Krasnogorsk factory, which had been producing a variety of optical equipment for the military since 1942, was also the manufacturer of the popular Zenit SLR cameras.

Zenit 2s also carried ELINT equipment called Kust-12M (bush) to receive NATO radar signals. However, it is unclear if the antenna transmitted recorded signals to the ground or was for intercepting radar signals. In the latter case they would have been recorded on magnetic tape, to be retrieved after the return capsule landed.

There were 81 Zenit 2 launches.  58 were successful and 11 were partially successful. There were 12 failed missions, 5 because of a satellite malfunction and 7 because of a failure in the launch vehicle.

First flight – Kosmos 4, 1962. Last flight – Kosmos 344, 1970.

Zenit 2M 
Improvements included a new camera system and the addition of solar panels. As the spacecraft mass was increased to 6300 kg, the Vostok rocket was replaced by the Voskhod rocket and 
Soyuz rockets. In common with Zenit 2 satellites this also had an ELINT payload.

First flight – Kosmos 208, 1968. Last flight – Kosmos 1044, 1978.

Zenit 4 
Unlike Zenit 2, little information on Zenit 4 has been released. The Zenit 4 was intended for high-resolution photography and carried one camera of 3000 mm focal length as well as a 200 mm camera. The focal length of the main camera was greater than the diameter of the capsule so the camera made use of a mirror to fold the light path. The ground resolution is not publicly known but it is believed to have been 1–2 metre.

The Zenit 4 had a mass of 6300 kg — around 1800 kg more than the Zenit 2. So, instead of the Vostok rocket, it was launched by the heavier Voskhod rocket. A total of 76 Zenit 4's were flown.

First flight – Kosmos 22, 1963. Last flight – Kosmos 355, 1970.

Zenit 4 M 
An improved version of the Zenit 4, the Zenit 4M carried a new camera, solar panels, and a restartable engine so the satellite's orbit could be altered during the course of its mission. The mission duration was 13 days.

First flight – Kosmos 251, 1968. Last flight – Kosmos 667, 1974.

Zenit 4 MK / Zenit 4 MKM 
These may have been versions of the Zenit 4 designed specifically to fly in lower orbits to improve image resolution. Some sources claim they were fitted with devices to compensate for aerodynamic drag and to withstand the effects of aerodynamic heating.

First flight – Kosmos 371, 1970. Last flight – Kosmos 1214, 1980.

Zenit 4 MT 
A special version of the Zenit 4M intended for topographical photography. It carried an SA-106 topographic camera, a laser altimeter and Doppler apparatus.

First flight – Kosmos 470, 1971. Last flight – Kosmos 1398, 1982.

Zenit 6U 
A "universal" version of the Zenit, intended for both low-altitude, high-resolution missions and higher-altitude, general observation missions. All flights used the Soyuz launch vehicle. There were 96 launches.

First flight – Kosmos 867, 1976. Last flight – Kosmos 1685, 1985.

Zenit 8 
This was intended for military cartographic photography. It used a Soyuz launch vehicle and launches took place from both Baikonur and Plesetsk. It had a 15-day orbital life. Similar satellites were referred to using the "Resurs-DK No.1" designation.

Kosmos 2281, was the last Zenit flight.

First flight – Kosmos 1571, 1984. Last flight – Kosmos 2281, 1994.

Following the end of the programme, one Zenit-8 satellite was launched on the maiden flight of the Soyuz-2 launch vehicle, as a DemoSat. The satellite was placed on a sub-orbital trajectory, and intentionally impacted the Pacific Ocean shortly after launch.

References

Reconnaissance satellites of the Soviet Union
Reconnaissance satellites of Russia
Satellites formerly orbiting Earth
Satellite series
Military equipment introduced in the 1960s